The Brass Founders' Pillar, also known as the Brassfounders Column, is a monumental column in Edinburgh, Scotland.

History 
The column was designed by James Gowans as the showpiece for the Brassfounders' Guild of Edinburgh and Leith for the International Exhibition of Industry, Science and Art, a world's fair held in Edinburgh in 1886. The statue at the top of the statue depicts Tubal-cain and was designed by John Stevenson Rhind. At the fair, the column won a gold medal. Following the fair, the monument was moved to Nicolson Square in Edinburgh, where it still stands. In 2008, the square and column underwent slight restoration.

Design 
The monument consists of a granite base with a bronze square shaft consisting of six tiers. Each tier shows a heraldic coat of arms. The bronze statue of Tubal-cain on top of the shaft is in reference to his description in the Book of Genesis as being the first metalsmith. A bronze plaque attached to the base reads:

See also 

 1886 in art

References

External links 
 
 

1886 establishments in Scotland
1886 sculptures
Buildings and structures completed in 1886
Monuments and memorials in Edinburgh